Plaimpied-Givaudins is a commune in the Cher department in the Centre-Val de Loire region of France.

Geography
A farming area comprising the two villages and several hamlets situated along the banks of the river Auron and the canal de Berry, immediately to the south of Bourges at the junction of the D106 with the N142 and with the D31 and the D46 roads.

The river has been dammed and has created an  lake in the north of the commune.

Population

Sights
 The abbey church of St. Martin, dating from the eleventh century.
 The chateau du Porche.
 The fourteenth-century gatehouse of the old abbey.
 Remains of a Roman aqueduct at Saint-Ladre.

See also
Communes of the Cher department

References

Communes of Cher (department)